Romeo Hanover (1963–1988) was a Standardbred racehorse won became the third horse to ever win the Triple Crown of Harness Racing for Pacers.

Trained by Jerry Silverman, during his career Romeo Hanover was driven by William Myer, George Sholty, Stanley Dancer and Del Miller.
In 2005 he was inducted into the United States Harness Racing Hall of Fame

References

American Standardbred racehorses
Cane Pace winners
Little Brown Jug winners
Messenger Stakes winners
United States Harness Racing Hall of Fame inductees
Harness racing in the United States
Triple Crown of Harness Racing winners